PR domain zinc finger protein 9 is a protein that in humans is encoded by the PRDM9 gene. PRDM9 is responsible for positioning recombination hotspots during meiosis by binding a DNA sequence motif encoded in its zinc finger domain. PRDM9 is the only speciation gene found so far in mammals, and is one of the fastest evolving genes in the genome.

Domain Architecture

PRDM9 has multiple domains including KRAB domain, SSXRD, PR/SET domain (H3K4 & H3K36 trimethyltransferase), and an array of C2H2 Zinc Finger domains (DNA binding).

History 
In 1974 Jiri Forejt and P. Ivanyi identified a locus which they named Hst1 which controlled hybrid sterility.

In 1982 a haplotype was identified controlling recombination rate wm7, which would later be identified as PRDM9.

In 1991 a protein binding to the minisatelite consensus sequence 5′-CCACCTGCCCACCTCT-3′ was detected and partially purified (named Msbp3 - minisatelite binding protein 3). This would later turn out to be the same PRDM9 protein independently identified later.

In 2005 a gene was identified (named Meisetz) that is required for progression through meiotic prophase and has H3K4 methyltransferase activity.

In 2009 Jiri Forejt and colleagues identified Hst1 as Meisetz/PRDM9 - the first and so far only speciation gene in mammals.

Later in 2009 PRDM9 was identified as one of the fastest evolving genes in the genome.

In 2010 three groups independently identified PRDM9 as controlling the positioning of recombination hotspots in humans and mice.

in 2012 it was shown that almost all hotspots are positioned by PRDM9 and that in its absence hotspots form near promoters.

In 2014 it was reported that the PRDM9 SET domain could also trimethylate H3K36 in vitro, which was confirmed in vivo in 2016.

In 2016 it was shown that the hybrid sterility caused by PRDM9 can be reversed and that the sterility is caused by asymmetric double strand breaks.

Function in Recombination
PRDM9 mediates the process of meiosis by directing the sites of homologous recombination. In humans and mice, recombination does not occur evenly throughout the genome but at particular sites along the chromosomes called recombination hotspots.  Hotspots are regions of DNA about 1-2kb in length.  There are approximately 30,000 to 50,000 hotspots within the human genome corresponding to one for every 50-100kb DNA on average.  In humans, the average number of crossover recombination events per hotspot is one per 1,300 meioses, and the most extreme hotspot has a crossover frequency of one per 110 meioses.  These hotspots are binding sites for the PRDM9 Zinc Finger array. Upon binding to DNA, PRDM9 catalyzes trimethylation of Histone 3 at lysine 4 and lysine 36. As a result, local nucleosomes are reorganized and through an unknown mechanism the recombination machinery is recruited to form double strand breaks.

Notes

References

Further reading

External links 
 
 UCSC GenomeWiki - PRDM9: Meiosis and Recombination

Transcription factors